Wood Peter Julmis (born 28 May 2001) is a Bahamian footballer who plays for Dynamos FC and the Bahamas national football team.

Youth career
Julmis played for the Knights of CR Walker Senior High School in Nassau while attending the school. In 2018, the team advanced to the finals of the Government Secondary Schools Sports Association (GSSSA) championship with a victory over the Mystic Marlins in the semi-finals. Julmis scored a goal in the 3–1 victory. The Knights went on to win the championship that season and the two following seasons for three consecutive championships through 2020. Julmis served as the team's captain and was its #9. In the 2019 championship match, Julmis scored the game-tying goal in the 90th minute to send the game to extra-time.

Club career
Julmis has played for BFA Senior League club Dynamos FC since 2017. In February 2018 he scored a hattrick against Future Stars FC for the U18 team. In 2019 he led the team to the BFA Senior League title with a win over Cavalier FC. Julmis scored a hattrick in the championship match.

International career
Julmis was called up as part of the Bahamas' squad for the first time for 2022 FIFA World Cup qualification matches in March 2021. He went on to make his senior international debut against Saint Kitts and Nevis on 27 March. The match ended in a 0–4 loss with Julmis starting and playing the entire match. In May 2022 Julmis scored his first two senior international goals in back-to-back friendlies against the Turks and Caicos in preparation for the  2022–23 CONCACAF Nations League B.

International goals
Scores and results list the Bahamas' goal tally first.

International career statistics

Personal
He is the brother of fellow Bahamas international Evelt Julmis.

References

External links
National Football Teams profile
Soccerway profile

2001 births
Living people
Bahamian footballers
Bahamas international footballers
Association football forwards
Sportspeople from Nassau, Bahamas